The Oriental Institute in Sarajevo is an academic institute in Sarajevo, Bosnia and Herzegovina. It was founded in 1950 by the Socialist Republic of Bosnia and Herzegovina and is part of the University of Sarajevo. but it suffered significant destruction in 1992 during the Siege of Sarajevo.

1992 shelling
Its premises, research library and complete manuscript collection (more than 2,000 codices and 15,000 other archival material) were deliberately destroyed in shelling on May 18, 1992 by Army of Republika Srpska forces around the besieged city of Sarajevo. According to interviews with eyewitnesses, the building had been hit with a barrage of incendiary munitions, fired from positions on the hills overlooking the town center. No other buildings in the densely built neighborhood were hit. The Institute, which occupied the top floors of a large, four-storey office block on the corner of Veljka Cubrilovica Street and Marshal Tito Boulevard (Sarajevo Centar municipality), was completely burned out, its collections destroyed.

The manuscript collection of the Oriental institute was one of the richest collections of Oriental manuscripts worldwide. These manuscripts over centuries were written in the wide areas of the East to serve worldwide as life manuals for the people.

Losses also included 5,263 bound manuscripts in Arabic, Persian, Turkish, Hebrew and local arebica - (Bosnian in Arabic script), as well as tens of thousands of Ottoman-era documents. Only about 1% of Institute materials was saved.

See also 
 Destruction of libraries
 Book Burning
 Vijećnica

References

Further reading 
 Documenting Destruction - See slides 1, and 15-17.
 Destruction of cultural heritage in Bosnia-Herzegovina 1992-1996 - A Post-war Survey of Selected Municipalities

External links
 The Oriental Institute in Sarajevo - Official Web Site

Research institutes in Bosnia and Herzegovina
Social science institutes
Buildings and structures in Sarajevo
Siege of Sarajevo
Buildings and structures demolished in 1992
Culture in Sarajevo
Book burnings
University of Sarajevo